Church of St. Casimir the Prince may refer to:

 Church of St. Casimir the Prince, Kraków
 St. Casimir the Prince Church, Września